Mulkireedam is a 1967 Indian Malayalam film, directed and produced by N. N. Pisharady. The film stars Sharada, Adoor Bhasi, P. J. Antony and Sankaradi in the lead roles. The film had musical score by Prathap Singh.

Cast
Sathyan
Sharada
Adoor Bhasi
P. J. Antony
Sankaradi
T. R. Omana
Indira Thampi
N. Govindankutty
Nellikode Bhaskaran
S. P. Pillai

Soundtrack
The music was composed by Prathap Singh and the lyrics were written by P. Bhaskaran.

References

External links
 

1967 films
1960s Malayalam-language films